Japanese entertainer Akina Nakamori has released 18 concert tour videos and 5 music video compilation.

Video albums

Concert tour videos

Music video compilations

Box sets

Filmography

Television

Commercials

See also

 Akina Nakamori singles discography
 Akina Nakamori albums discography
 List of best-selling music artists in Japan

Notes

References

External links
 

Video
Discographies of Japanese artists
Pop music discographies